IFC may refer to:

Buildings
 International Finance Centre (Hong Kong) (IFC), an integrated commercial building complex in Hong Kong
 International financial centre, home to a cluster of significant financial services providers
 Shanghai IFC, a building complex in Shanghai
 Guangzhou International Finance Center, a building in Tianhe District, Guangzhou

Computers and electronics
 Industry Foundation Classes, an object-based file format (IFC), intended to describe architectural, building and construction industry data, frequently used in building information modeling (BIM) based projects
 Initial Filter Criteria, similar to triggers in mobile networks
 Integer factorization, cryptography
 Integrated fluidic circuit, a type of integrated circuit (IC) using fluids
 Intel Fortran Compiler, a group of Fortran compilers from Intel for Windows, Linux, and OS X
 Intelligent flight control system (IFC or IFCS)
 Internet Foundation Classes, a now defunct graphics library for Java
 Intelligent Frame Creation, a motion interpolation feature of Panasonic televisions

Entertainment
 IFC (Canadian TV channel), a defunct Canadian cable TV channel
 IFC (U.S. TV channel), an American cable TV channel formerly known as the Independent Film Channel
 IFC Films, an American film distributor
 Irish Film Centre, former name of the Irish Film Institute

Organizations
 InterFaith Conference of Metropolitan Washington, an interfaith non-profit organization based in Washington, D.C.
 International Federation of Cheerleading, formed in 1998 and is a non-profit federation based in Tokyo, Japan
 International Filing Company, a manufacturer of filing supplies for the printing industry and several other businesses
 International Finance Corporation, a member of the World Bank Group
 Iraq Freedom Congress, an Iraqi organization
 North American Interfraternity Conference (IFC or NIC), an association of collegiate men's fraternities
 Irrawaddy Flotilla Company, was a passenger and cargo ferry company

Sports
 Ido's Football Club, a soccer club from Hendrik-Ido-Ambacht, Netherlands
 Ilioupoli F.C., a sports club in Greece
 Ilkeston F.C., an English football club based at the New Manor Ground in Ilkeston, Derbyshire
 International Football Cup, the original name for the UEFA Intertoto Cup

Other uses
 International Fixed Calendar, a calendar proposal
 International Freedom Center, a proposed museum for the World Trade Center site in New York City

See also
 IFC Mall (disambiguation)